The Opel Vectra GTS V8 DTM was a DTM touring car constructed by German car manufacturer Opel. The car's development started in mid-2002 and it was raced in the 2004 and 2005 DTM seasons with little success before the company's exit after the 2005 season. Opel withdrew from DTM due to parent company General Motors focusing on the BTCC and FIA WTCC series in the European sector as well as reducing the company's annual costs. The Vectra GTS V8 DTM replaced the Opel Astra DTM at the end of the 2003 season and was based on the production Opel Astra C. The Opel Vectra GTS V8 DTM was involved in an accident involving Peter Dumbreck at the Zandvoort after his car lost control and rolled several times, but the driver was uninjured.

The Opel Vectra GTS V8 DTM is powered by a 4.0-litre V8 engine built by Spiess Tuning AG.

References

External links

Opel Motorsport official website
DTM Official Website In German Language

Vectra GTS V8 DTM
Deutsche Tourenwagen Masters cars